Miguel Javid Hernández Rodríguez (born March 20, 1976, in Veracruz City, Veracruz) is a Mexican football manager and former player.

Hernández played in the Mexican Primera División with Tiburones Rojos de Veracruz and Monarcas Morelia, debuting in 1994 with Veracruz.

External links
 
 

1976 births
Living people
Mexican footballers
Mexican football managers
C.D. Veracruz footballers
Atlético Morelia players
Albinegros de Orizaba footballers
Liga MX players
Ascenso MX players
Footballers from Veracruz
People from Veracruz (city)
Association football defenders